Taylor McNallie (born 1990) is a Canadian anti-racism activist and the co-founder of Inclusive Canada. She is also the Organizer for Black Lives Matter Canada, and a member of the Walls Down Collective.

Early life 
McNallie was born in Saskatoon to a white mother and moved to Cremona, Alberta as a young child. A few years later they both moved to Didsbury. As an eleven year old child, McNallie was racially abused by an older boy, for being Black.At the age of sixteen years, McNallie moved in with friend in Calgary.

Career and activism 
McNallie is the owner of Taylor Made Studios and the producer of Taylor Made Radio Entertainment Network. After the 2020 murder of George Floyd, McNallie co-founded Inclusive Canada, an anti-racist group. The group was initially called Rural Alberta Against Racism. Taylor is known for her critique of Calgary Police and her activism work has made her, and her family, the target of racist abuse.

In 2020 she was charged with assault with a weapon by Red Deer Royal Canadian Mounted Police following events at Black Lives Matter event in Red Deer. McNallie described the charge as "as joke" and indicated she would defend the charge in a court of law. The charge was withdrawn in January 2022.

Personal life 
As of 2022, McNallie lived in Calgary with her boyfriend and her ten year old daughter. She was aged 31 in January 2022.

References

External links 

 Taylor McNallie Twitter account
 Inclusive Canada official website
 Taylor Made Studios official website
 Taylor Made Radio Entertainment Network - Facebook page

Living people
Activists from Saskatchewan
Activists from Alberta
People from Cremona
People from Didsbury, Alberta
Women founders
Organization founders
Canadian anti-racism activists
1990s births